Arlington Hotel may refer to:

Arlington Hotel (Paris, Ontario), Canada
Arlington Hotel (Hot Springs National Park), Arkansas, United States
Arlington Hotel (Santa Barbara, California), United States
Haleʻākala or Arlington Hotel, a former Hawaiian residence
Arlington Hotel (Narrowsburg, New York), United States
Arlington Hotel (Zanesville, Ohio), United States
Arlington Hotel (Echo, Oregon), United States
Arlington Hotel (Washington, D.C.), United States
Arlington Hotel Open, a former PGA golf tour